Augy is a commune in the department of Aisne in the Hauts-de-France region of northern France.

Geography
Augy is located 10 km east by southeast of Soissons and 35 km west by northwest of Rheims.  National Highway N31 (E46, D1251) from Soissons to Rheims passes through the heart of the commune just north of the village. The village can be reached on the D1310 road which branches southwest from the N31 into the village then east to join the D22 road from Braine which passes through the southeastern part of the commune. The commune is mostly farmland with areas of forest along the borders - particularly in the west, south, and southeast.

The Vesle river forms the northeastern border of the commune and a stream flows from the village to join the Vesle.

Neighbouring communes and villages

Administration

List of Successive Mayors of Augy

Population

Church

The Parish Church of Saint-Remi (12th century). is registered as an historical monument. The church contains many items that are registered as historical objects:

The Tombstone of Charles de Morienne (17th century)
A Statuette: Virgin and child (14th century)
A Statue: Virgin and child (18th century)
A Wayside Cross (1928)
A Monumental Painting: Christ in majesty (1935)
The Furniture in the church
A set of 14 Stained glass windows (1930)
A Wayside Cross (20th century)
A Monumental Painting: the Crowning of the Virgin (1931)
A Statue: Virgin and child (18th century)
A Statuette: Virgin and child (14th century)
A Funeral monument for Charles de Morienne (1616)

See also
Communes of the Aisne department

References

External links
Augy on the old IGN website 
Bell Towers website 
40000 bell towers website 
Augy on Géoportail, National Geographic Institute (IGN) website 
Augy on the 1750 Cassini Map

Communes of Aisne